Ana Galindo Santolaria (born 16 August 1973) is a Spanish former alpine skier who competed in the 1998 Winter Olympics and in the 2002 Winter Olympics.

References

1973 births
Living people
Spanish female alpine skiers
Olympic alpine skiers of Spain
Alpine skiers at the 1998 Winter Olympics
Alpine skiers at the 2002 Winter Olympics